The Thorn Birds may refer to:

The Thorn Birds, a 1977 novel by Colleen McCullough
The Thorn Birds (miniseries), a 1983 miniseries based on the novel starring Richard Chamberlain
The Thorn Birds (2011 TV series), a South Korean television series
The Thorn Birds: The Missing Years, a 1996 miniseries related to the 1983 miniseries
The Thorn Birds Musical, a 2009 musical adaptation of the novel
The Thornbirds, a band including Russ Parrish and Stix Zadinia

See also
Thornbirds, the bird genus Phacellodomus